Michelle Nicastro (March 31, 1960 – November 4, 2010) was an American actress and singer.

Life and career
Nicastro was born in Washington D.C., the daughter of Carole Rose (née Guarino) and Norman Joseph Nicastro, who was an ophthalmologist.

She provided the speaking voice of the adult Princess Odette, the titular character in The Swan Princess and its first two sequels The Swan Princess: Escape from Castle Mountain and The Swan Princess III: The Mystery of the Enchanted Treasure.

She also did the singing voice of Callisto for the Xena: Warrior Princess episode "The Bitter Suite". She also had guest starring roles in Airwolf, Knight Rider and Wings.

She appeared, briefly, as the college sweetheart of Billy Crystal in When Harry Met Sally.... In 1996, she played Snow White in Coach episode "Grimmworld" as the girlfriend of Michael "Dauber" Daubinski (Bill Fagerbakke). Nicastro also had a minor role in Full House as Roxanna. She also played Lois "Old Lady" Scranton on an episode of Who's the Boss?. From September 1989 to May 1990, she appeared as singer Sasha Schmidt on Santa Barbara during one of its Daytime-Emmy-award-winning years.

On the stage, she created the role of Ariadne in the 1983 Broadway musical Merlin. She was the first Éponine in the second United States tour of Les Misérables in 1988. Nicastro recorded four albums released on the Varese Sarabande label. Two albums, Toonful and Toonful Too, feature songs from animated musicals, Reel Imagination features songs from family musicals, and On My Own features songs from contemporary Broadway musicals, including her version of On My Own. They feature Paul Goldberg on drums and percussion, Walt Fowler on trumpet, Jimmy Hoff on bass, and Lanny Meyers piano/arranger.

Death
Nicastro died of breast and brain cancer on November 4, 2010, at home with her family. She was 50 years old. "For the Good of Our Country", an episode of The Event that originally aired November 15, 2010, is dedicated to her memory. The pilot episode of Fairly Legal, originally aired January 20, 2011, was dedicated to her memory and a character in the series Judge David Nicastro (played by Gerald McRaney) is named after her. Both series were executive produced by her husband Steve Stark.

Partial filmography
Body Rock (1984) - Darlene
Knight Rider (1985) - Circus Knights - Terry Major
Bad Guys (1986) - Janice Edwards
Full House (1987) - Sea Cruise - Roxanna
When Harry Met Sally... (1989) - Amanda (cameos)
The Swan Princess (1994) - Princess Odette (as an adult; speaking voice)
Coach (1996) - Mary Beth (as Dauber’s girlfriend - Episode: Grimworld)
Wings (1996) - Ariel Reed (as Antonio’s dream girl - Episode: The lady vanishes)
The Swan Princess: Escape from Castle Mountain (1997) - Princess Odette (voice; speaking and singing)
The Swan Princess III: The Mystery of the Enchanted Treasure (1998) - Princess Odette (voice; speaking and singing)
Aladdin and the Adventure of All Time (2000) - Queen Cleopatra

References

External links

Fan site with commentary on her roles
Find a Grave

1960 births
2010 deaths
Musicians from Washington, D.C.
Actresses from Washington, D.C.
American film actresses
American musical theatre actresses
American television actresses
American voice actresses
Burials at Forest Lawn Memorial Park (Hollywood Hills)
Deaths from cancer in California
Deaths from breast cancer
Deaths from brain cancer in the United States
American people of Italian descent
21st-century American women